was the seventh vessel to be commissioned in the 19-vessel s built for the Imperial Japanese Navy in the late-1930s under the Circle Three Supplementary Naval Expansion Program (Maru San Keikaku). She survived four major fleet actions against the Allies, but was finally sunk in November 1943 after being damaged through collision with Japanese cruiser .

Background
The Kagerō-class destroyers were outwardly almost identical to the preceding light cruiser-sized , with improvements made by Japanese naval architects to improve stability and to take advantage of Japan’s lead in torpedo technology. They were designed to accompany the Japanese main striking force and in both day and night attacks against the United States Navy as it advanced across the Pacific Ocean, according to Japanese naval strategic projections. Despite being one of the most powerful classes of destroyers in the world at the time of their completion, only one survived the Pacific War.

Hatsukaze, built at the Kawasaki Shipbuilding Corporation, was laid down on 3 December 1937, launched on 24 January 1939 and commissioned on 15 February 1940.

Operational history

Invasions of Southeast Asia
At the time of the attack on Pearl Harbor, Hatsukaze, was assigned to Destroyer Division 16 (Desdiv 16), and a member of Destroyer Squadron 2 (Desron 2) of the IJN 2nd Fleet, and had deployed from Palau, as part of the escort for the aircraft carrier  in the invasion of the southern Philippines and minelayer .

In early 1942, Hatsukaze participated in the invasion of the Netherlands East Indies, escorting the invasion forces for Menado, Kendari and Ambon in January, and the invasion forces for Makassar, Timor and eastern Java in February. On 27–28 February, Hatsukaze and Desron 2 participated in the Battle of the Java Sea, taking part in a torpedo attack on the Allied fleet. During the month of March, Desron 2 was engaged in anti-submarine operations in the Java Sea. At the end of the month, the squadron escorted the Christmas Island invasion force, then returned to Makassar. At the end of April, Hatsukaze sailed to Kure Naval Arsenal for maintenance, docking on 3 May.

On 21 May 1942, Hatsukaze and Desron 2 steamed from Kure to Saipan, where they rendezvoused with a troop convoy and sailed toward Midway Island. Due to the defeat of the Carrier Striking Force and loss of four fleet carriers in the Battle of Midway, the invasion was called off and the convoy withdrew without seeing combat. Desdiv 16 was ordered back to Kure.

Solomon Islands campaign
On 14 July, Hatsukaze and Desdiv 16 were reassigned to Desron 10, Third Fleet. On 16 August, Desron 10 departed Kure, escorting a fleet towards Truk. On 24 August, Desron 10 escorted Admiral Nagumo's Striking Force in the Battle of the Eastern Solomons. During September and October, the squadron escorted the fleet patrolling out of Truk north of the Solomon Islands. On 26 October, in the Battle of the Santa Cruz Islands, the squadron escorted the Striking Force, then escorted the damaged carriers  and  into Truk on 28 October. On 4 November, Desron 10 escorted  from Truk to Kure, then engaged in training in the Inland Sea, and then escorted Zuikaku from Truk to the Shortland Islands in January 1943.

On 10 January, while providing cover for a supply-drum transport run to Guadalcanal, Hatsukaze assisted in sinking the American PT boats PT-43 and PT-112. She suffered heavy damage when struck by a torpedo (possibly launched by PT-112) in the port side; her best speed was 18 knots as she withdrew to Truk, for emergency repairs. Then she sailed to Kure in April for more extensive repairs. In September, Hatsukaze and Desron 10 escorted the battleship  from Kure to Truk. In late September and again in late October, Desron 10 escorted the main fleet from Truk to Eniwetok and back again, in response to American carrier airstrikes in the Central Pacific region. Between these two missions, Hatsukaze sortied briefly from Truk in early October 1943 to assist the fleet oiler Hazakaya, which had been torpedoed by an American submarine.

Final battle
On 2 November 1943, while attacking an Allied task force off Bougainville in the Battle of Empress Augusta Bay, Hatsukaze collided with the cruiser . The collision sheared off her bow, leaving her dead in the water. Hatsukaze and the light cruiser  were sunk (at position ) by Allied destroyer gunfire. Of those on board, 164 were killed, including its commanding officer, Lieutenant Commander Buichi Ashida.
Hatsukaze was removed from the navy list on 5 January 1944.

Notes

Books

External links
 CombinedFleet.com: Kagero-class destroyers.
 CombinedFleet.com: Tabular Record of Movement of Hatsukaze.

Hatsukaze
Hatsukaze
Shipwrecks in the Solomon Sea
World War II shipwrecks in the Pacific Ocean
1939 ships
Ships built by Kawasaki Heavy Industries
Maritime incidents in November 1943